Mount Morris is a village in Mount Morris Township, Ogle County, Illinois, United States. The population was 2,998 at the 2010 census, down from 3,013 in 2000.

Geography

Mount Morris is located at  (42.047614, -89.433972).

The village is crossed from east to west by Illinois Route 64. Route 64 continues eastward to Chicago and westward into Iowa, where is keeps its numeric designation.

History
Mt. Morris is home of the Illinois Freedom Bell, which is located in the town square. The area that is now the town square used to be the campus of one of Illinois' first institutes of higher learning, Mount Morris College. It was first a Methodist school and was later affiliated with the Church of the Brethren. The college closed due to hard economic times.  The village's old Junior High School, while undergoing demolition, caught fire and burned forcing the school district to be merged with the Oregon School District in 1993.   On February 12, 2004, the Rahn Elementary School was lost to fire. This resulted in the reorganization of the Oregon School District. The former Oregon city elementary and middle schools were merged into a single elementary school. The Mt. Morris  Highschool has since been used as the middle school for the district. The town is also home of a very large group of lustron homes in IL.  These can be located on First street(5 houses),Hannah avenue(3 houses), and Sunset lane(5 houses). The town has a total of 18 lustrons.   The houses were built here to meet a shortage of housing for a local printing company.

Recreation
Parks include Dillehay Park, Mounder Park, and Zickuhr Park.  Dillehay Park is located in the southeast portion of the village. Zickuhr Park is located in the western part of town, and has one softball diamond, basketball courts, and an array of playground equipment.  Mounder Park houses a skating park, a pavilion, and the playground equipment that was donated and relocated by the school after the Rahn Elementary School fire.

Demographics

As of the census of 2000, there were 3,013 people, 1,259 households, and 810 families residing in the village. The racial makeup of the village was 97.15% White, 0.17% African American, 0.20% Native American, 0.43% Asian, 0.13% Pacific Islander, 1.00% from other races, and 0.93% from two or more races. Hispanic or Latino of any race were 2.75% of the population.

There were 1,259 households, out of which 29.3% had children under the age of 18 living with them, 50.8% were married couples living together, 10.6% had a female householder with no husband present, and 35.6% were non-families. 32.2% of all households were made up of individuals, and 14.9% had someone living alone who was 65 years of age or older. The average household size was 2.28 and the average family size was 2.86.

In the village, the population was spread out, with 23.8% under the age of 18, 7.3% from 18 to 24, 26.5% from 25 to 44, 19.9% from 45 to 64, and 22.5% who were 65 years of age or older. The median age was 40 years. For every 100 females, there were 90.8 males. For every 100 females age 18 and over, there were 86.0 males.

The median income for a household in the village was $41,333, and the median income for a family was $51,019. Males had a median income of $39,323 versus $20,840 for females. The per capita income for the village was $20,326. About 6.0% of families and 6.9% of the population were below the poverty line, including 13.2% of those under age 18 and 5.9% of those age 65 or over.

Notable people 

 Akiane Kramarik, painter; born in Mount Morris
 Nels Potter, pitcher for five Major League Baseball teams; born in Mount Morris
 Nelson Thomas Potter, Jr., university professor and scholar
 Ralph Waldo Trine, educator and philosopher
 W. H. L. Wallace, Civil War general; lived in Mount Morris
 Second Lieutenant Elaine A. (Roe) Pieper, one of four Army Nurses to receive the Silver Star in World War II, Resided in Mount Morris with her husband

See also
 Samuel M. Hitt House
 White Pines Forest State Park
 White Pines State Park Lodge and Cabins

References

External links

 Description of Mount Morris
 Mt. Morris Public Library
 Mt. Morris Fire Protection District
Oregon-Mt. Morris School merger
The Kable Brothers Company
Mt. Morris History

 
Villages in Ogle County, Illinois
Villages in Illinois
Rockford metropolitan area, Illinois